"Sleeping Sickness" is the second single from City and Colour's second album, Bring Me Your Love. The song features vocals from Gord Downie, the lead singer of The Tragically Hip. The single was certified Platinum in Canada on December 10, 2018. The song was used by CBC's Hockey Night In Canada during a video tribute at the end of the 2009 Stanley Cup Playoffs.

Chart positions

References

External links

2008 singles
City and Colour songs